Intersections is the third studio album by Dave House.

Track listing
 Lungs
 Rails
 Follow Me
 Born Steady
 Runaground
 Make An Example
 60 Blocks Up
 Where The Streets Collide
 I Still Connect
 10-42

References

External links
Page on BanquetRecords.com

2009 albums
Folk albums by British artists